André Corriveau is a film editor and director from Quebec, Canada. Corriveau won the Gemini Awards once (1994), and the Genie Award twice (1981 and 1985). In addition to the wins, he has one nomination to the Gemini Awards, six nominations to the Genie Awards, and one nomination to the Jutra Awards.

His editing credits include the 2004 documentary My Son Shall Be Armenian.

External links 

 

Year of birth missing (living people)
Living people
Canadian film editors
Film directors from Quebec
French Quebecers
Best Editing Genie and Canadian Screen Award winners